R.W. Knudsen Family is a brand of bottled natural juices created by Russell W. Knudsen in 1961. For several years, R.W. Knudsen Family was part of The J.M. Smucker Company, an Ohio-based beverage and food manufacturer.

On January 31, 2022, Smuckers sold the brand to Nexus Capital Management LP.

Products

Created by Knudsen on his farm in California, the company manufactures over 125 different products, many using organic ingredients. Its most well-known line is a family of natural, non-carbonated juices sold in 32 fl. oz. glass jars, available in the United States at natural food stores and supermarkets.

Recharge and Spritzers are part of the range of products offered using the brand. While the former is a sports energy drink marketed as a natural competitor to Gatorade, Spritzers is a line of juice-flavored carbonated drinks sold in 12 fl. ounce aluminum cans.

All of Knudsen's products are shelf-stable without refrigeration; as such, they do not directly compete with refrigerated juices such as Odwalla and Naked Juice.

See also 
 List of food companies

References

External links 
 Official Website

Drink companies of the United States
Drink companies based in California
2022 mergers and acquisitions